USS Metomkin has been the name of more than one United States Navy ship, and may refer to:

 , a seaplane tender that was cancelled in 1943 before construction could begin
 , a cargo ship in commission from 1947 to 1951

United States Navy ship names